Biert is a hamlet in the Dutch province of South Holland. It is located in the municipality of Nissewaard, about 3 km west of Spijkenisse.

Biert was a separate municipality between 1817 and 1855, when it became part of Geervliet.

References

Populated places in South Holland
Former municipalities of South Holland
Nissewaard